Estate Hogansborg is located east of Frederiksted off Centerline Road in the Northwest district of Saint Croix, U.S. Virgin Islands, or the West End Quarter of Saint Croix. It dates back to 1757. It was listed on the U.S. National Register of Historic Places in 1978.

The estate includes a great house and two other houses, and remains of the island's first steam-powered sugar factory, of a later factory, of a slave village, and of other accessory buildings.

References

Sugar plantations in Saint Croix, U.S. Virgin Islands
Plantations in the Danish West Indies
Residential buildings completed in 1757
National Register of Historic Places in the United States Virgin Islands
1757 establishments in North America
1750s establishments in the Caribbean
1750s establishments in Denmark
18th century in the Danish West Indies